Fierce Creatures is a 1997 British-American farcical comedy film. While not literally a sequel, Fierce Creatures is a spiritual successor to the 1988 film A Fish Called Wanda. Both films star John Cleese, Jamie Lee Curtis, Kevin Kline and Michael Palin. Fierce Creatures was written by John Cleese and directed by Robert Young and Fred Schepisi.

The film was dedicated to Gerald Durrell and Peter Cook. Some scenes were filmed at Jersey Zoo, a zoological park founded by Durrell.

Plot

Willa Weston arrives in Atlanta to take a high-ranking position in a company recently acquired by Octopus Inc.'s owner, Rod McCain. When he informs her he has already sold the company, she then agrees to run another recent acquisition, Marwood Zoo. She is to create a business model that can be used for multiple zoos in the future. Rod McCain's son Vincent, who is attracted to Willa, announces that he will join her at the zoo.

The zoo's newly appointed director is a retired Hong Kong Police Force officer and former Octopus Television employee, Rollo Lee. To meet Octopus's revenue target of 20% from all assets, he institutes a "fierce creatures" theme. Believing dangerous and violent animals will attract more visitors, all animals not meeting those requirements must go. 

All the animal keepers, including spider-handler Bugsy, try to change Rollo's mind. One such attempt involves getting him to kill some of the cutest animals himself, but Rollo sees through their prank and fakes the animals' extermination. He keeps the animals in his bedroom which later causes Willa and Vincent to believe he is having an orgy with female staff.

Rollo discovers that several staff members are faking animal attack injuries. He fires several warning shots at those responsible and Reggie rushes in, believing that one of them is shot. Rollo then finds a visitor who has had a genuine accident but, not believing it is real, tastes her blood whilst loudly proclaiming that it is fake. Willa and Vincent, upon seeing this fiasco, demote Rollo to middle management. Vince even threatens to fire him if he does not cease his apparent activities with the female staff.

Vince covers both the zoo and animals alike with advertisements after garnering sponsors, dresses the staff in ridiculous outfits, and installs an artificial panda in one of the enclosures. His continued attempts to seduce Willa fail, while she comes to enjoy working at the zoo after connecting with a silverback gorilla. 

Willa finds herself attracted to Rollo after becoming fascinated by his apparent ability to attract multiple women. When he tries to discuss Vince's marketing plan, she suggests dinner, but she postpones when she remembers Rod is coming from Atlanta to discuss the running of the zoo.

Worried that the visit might be part of a plan to close the zoo, Rollo and the zookeepers bug Rod's hotel room to find out. Although the plan goes awry, they discover he wants to sell it to Japanese investors who'll turn it into a golf course. Also, he plans to have himself cryogenically frozen whenever he gets ill so Vince would never inherit anything.

Discovering Vince has stolen sponsorship money he raised, Willa warns him to return it, or she will tell Rod. As Rollo attempts to work out how the theft can be traced, he and Willa finally kiss, just as Vince arrives to return the money. A confrontation then ensues as Willa, Rollo, Bugsy, and several others attempt to stop Vince from running off with the money. 

Rod arrives just as Vince, who is holding a gun, is being subdued and announces the police are on their way to arrest him for stealing. Vince tries and fails to shoot his father, but then Bugsy takes the pistol and accidentally shoots Rod between the eyes.

In the panic that follows, a plan emerges to fool Neville and the arriving police. The keepers work together to dress Vince up as Rod, as he can imitate his father's accent fairly well. When they arrive, Vince (as Rod) tells them that he has rewritten the will, specifying that the zoo will become a trust for the caretakers while Vince will inherit everything else, and he asks all of them to be witnesses. 

After signing the new will, Vince locks himself in a caretaker hut where they fake Rod's suicide. Although Neville becomes suspicious, he is left dumbstruck when he finds his boss's dead body in the hut.

Now free, the zookeepers destroy the evidence of McCain's ownership. Vince becomes the new CEO of Octopus, while Willa and Rollo happily begin a new life together while continuing to run the zoo.

Cast

 John Cleese as Rollo Lee (née Leach), the twin brother of Archie Leach, Cleese's character from A Fish Called Wanda.
 Jamie Lee Curtis as Willa Weston
 Kevin Kline as Rod McCain/Vince McCain
 Michael Palin as Adrian 'Bugsy' Malone
 Robert Lindsay as Sydney Lotterby
 Ronnie Corbett as Reggie Sea Lions
 Carey Lowell as Cub Felines
 Bille Brown as Neville
 Derek Griffiths as Gerry Ungulates
 Maria Aitken as Di Harding
 Cynthia Cleese as Pip Small Mammals
 Richard Ridings as Hugh Primates
 Gareth Hunt as Inspector Masefield
 Tom Georgeson as Sealion Spectator
 John Bardon as Sealion Spectator
 Jack Davenport as Student Zoo Keeper

Production
Cleese began writing the script in 1992 and shooting began on 15 May 1995. It was completed in August and the film was previewed in November of that year. Preview audiences expressed dissatisfaction with the ending, and in February 1996 the decision was made to reshoot the ending and some other sequences. These additional scenes could not be shot until August 1996 because of the availability of the cast, in particular Michael Palin who was making Full Circle with Michael Palin. In the meantime, Cleese and Johnstone worked on a new ending with William Goldman. The delay meant that director Robert Young was busy on pre-production for Jane Eyre, so Cleese hired Fred Schepisi, with whom he had been discussing making a version of Don Quixote. The reshoots took five weeks and cost $7 million.

Schepisi claims he tried to get the producers to take out the opening 15 minutes, which was done for a test screening, but then some of this footage was put back in, which Schepisi thought killed the movie.

Reception
On Rotten Tomatoes, the film has a score of 53% based on 32 reviews with an average rating of 5.58/10. The site's critical consensus reads "Fierce Creatures reunites A Fish Called Wanda'''s talented ensemble for a comedy that, while not without its moments, suffers from diminishing returns".

Roger Ebert awarded the film two and a half out of four stars, and compared it unfavourably to A Fish Called Wanda, stating: "It lacks the hair-trigger timing, the headlong rush into comic illogic, that made Wanda so special."

The film grossed $9 million in the United States and Canada, £4 million ($7 million) in the United Kingdom and $24 million in the rest of the world, for a worldwide total of $40 million.

Cleese has since stated that following up A Fish Called Wanda with a second film had been a mistake. When asked in 2008 by his friend, director and restaurant critic Michael Winner what he would do differently if he could live his life again, Cleese responded, "I wouldn't have married Alyce Faye Eichelberger and I wouldn't have made Fierce Creatures''."

References

External links

1997 films
1997 comedy films
British comedy films
Films directed by Fred Schepisi
Films directed by Robert Young
Films shot at Pinewood Studios
Films with screenplays by John Cleese
Universal Pictures films
Films scored by Jerry Goldsmith
Films set in zoos
1990s English-language films
1990s British films